The 2023 Seattle Storm season will be the franchise's 24th season in the Women's National Basketball Association, and the second full season under Head Coach Noelle Quinn. Quinn took over in May of the 2021 season.

Transactions

WNBA Draft

Transactions

Roster Changes

Additions

Subtractions

Roster

Schedule

Regular Season

|- 
| 1
| May 20
| Las Vegas
| 
| 
| 
| 
| Climate Pledge Arena
| 
|- 
| 2
| May 26
| Dallas
| 
| 
| 
| 
| Climate Pledge Arena
| 
|- 
| 3
| May 30
| New York
| 
| 
| 
| 
| Climate Pledge Arena
| 

|- 
| 4
| June 3
| @ Los Angeles
| 
| 
| 
| 
| Crypto.com Arena
| 
|- 
| 5
| June 6
| Los Angeles
| 
| 
| 
| 
| Climate Pledge Arena
| 
|- 
| 6
| June 9
| Washington
| 
| 
| 
| 
| Climate Pledge Arena
| 
|- 
| 7
| June 11
| Washington
| 
| 
| 
| 
| Climate Pledge Arena
| 
|- 
| 8
| June 13
| @ Phoenix
| 
| 
| 
| 
| Footprint Center
| 
|- 
| 9
| June 15
| @ Las Vegas
| 
| 
| 
| 
| Michelob Ultra Arena
| 
|- 
| 10
| June 17
| @ Dallas
| 
| 
| 
| 
| College Park Center
| 
|- 
| 11
| June 20
| Connecticut
| 
| 
| 
| 
| Climate Pledge Arena
| 
|- 
| 12
| June 22
| Indiana
| 
| 
| 
| 
| Climate Pledge Arena
| 
|- 
| 13
| June 24
| Mercury
| 
| 
| 
| 
| Climate Pledge Arena
|
|- 
| 14
| June 27
| @ Minnesota
| 
| 
| 
| 
| Target Center
| 
|- 
| 15
| June 29
| Minnesota
| 
| 
| 
| 
| Climate Pledge Arena
| 

|- 
| 16
| July 2
| New York
| 
| 
| 
| 
| Climate Pledge Arena
| 
|- 
| 17
| July 6
| @ Connecticut
| 
| 
| 
| 
| Mohegan Sun Arena
|
|- 
| 18
| July 8
| @ New York
| 
| 
| 
| 
| Barclays Center
| 
|- 
| 19
| July 11
| @ Washington
| 
| 
| 
| 
| Entertainment and Sports Arena
|
|- 
| 20
| July 12
| @ Atlanta
| 
| 
| 
| 
| Gateway Center Arena
|
|- 
| 21
| July 20
| Las Vegas
| 
| 
| 
| 
| Climate Pledge Arena
|
|- 
| 22
| July 22
| Chicago
| 
| 
| 
| 
| Climate Pledge Arena
|
|- 
| 23
| July 25
| @ New York
| 
| 
| 
| 
| Barclays Center
|
|- 
| 24
| July 28
| @ Chicago
| 
| 
| 
| 
| Wintrust Arena
|
|- 
| 25
| July 30
| @ Indiana
| 
| 
| 
| 
| Gainbridge Fieldhouse
|

|- 
| 26
| August 2
| Dallas
| 
| 
| 
| 
| Climate Pledge Arena
|
|- 
| 27
| August 5
| @ Phoenix
| 
| 
| 
| 
| Footprint Center
|
|- 
| 28
| August 8
| Connecticut
| 
| 
| 
| 
| Climate Pledge Arena
|
|- 
| 29
| August 10
| Atlanta
| 
| 
| 
| 
| Climate Pledge Arena
|
|- 
| 30
| August 13
| Phoenix
| 
| 
| 
| 
| Climate Pledge Arena
|
|- 
| 31
| August 18
| Minnesota
| 
| 
| 
| 
| Climate Pledge Arena
|
|- 
| 32
| August 20
| @ Minnesota
| 
| 
| 
| 
| Target Center
|
|- 
| 33
| August 22
| @ Chicago
| 
| 
| 
| 
| Wintrust Arena
|
|- 
| 34
| August 24
| @ Indiana
| 
| 
| 
| 
| Gainbridge Fieldhouse
|
|- 
| 35
| August 27
| Chicago
| 
| 
| 
| 
| Climate Pledge Arena
|
|- 
| 36
| August 31
| @ Los Angeles
| 
| 
| 
| 
| Crypto.com Arena
|

|- 
| 37
| September 2
| @ Las Vegas
| 
| 
| 
| 
| Michelob Ultra Arena
|
|- 
| 38
| September 6
| @ Atlanta
| 
| 
| 
| 
| Gateway Center Arena
|
|- 
| 39
| September 8
| @ Dallas
| 
| 
| 
| 
| College Park Center
|
|- 
| 40
| September 10
| Los Angeles
| 
| 
| 
| 
| Climate Pledge Arena
|
|-

Standings

Statistics

Regular Season

Awards and Honors

References

External links
 Official website of the Seattle Storm

Seattle Storm
Seattle Storm seasons
Seattle Storm
Seattle Storm